Shahgai is a region in Pakistan's Federally Administered Tribal Areas.

A fortress built by British forces in 1927 to oversee the Khyber Pass and house the Khyber Rifles still stands, and is today used by the Pakistan Army.

In 2002/2003, Canadian Ahmed Khadr was asked to organise militants operating near the border of Shagai, and he subsequently asked his son Abdullah and Hamza al-Jowfi to help him procure weapons. He clashed with Abdul Hadi al Iraqi, arguing that guerrilla tactics would prove more useful than front line battle.

Pakistani forces shelled the village in September 2008.

References

Populated places in Khyber District